Ram Yadav may refer to:

 Ram Baran Yadav (born 1948), Nepali politician and former President of Nepal
 Ram Chandra Yadav (born 1961), Indian politician
 Ram Gopal Yadav (born 1946), Indian politician and Member of Parliament
 Ram Naresh Yadav (1928–2016), Indian politician and former Chief Minister of Uttar Pradesh
 Ram Sharan Yadav (1926–2005), Indian politician and Member of Parliament